William Winter Hamilton (26 June 1917 – 23 January 2000) was a British politician who served as a Labour Member of Parliament for constituencies in Fife, Scotland for 37 years, between 1950 and 1987. He was known for his strong republican views.

Background
Born in Houghton-le-Spring, the son of a County Durham miner, Hamilton joined the Labour Party as a teenager in 1936. He was educated at Washington Grammar School and Sheffield University (BA, DipEd), and following graduation became a schoolteacher. After initially being a conscientious objector in World War II, he served as a captain with the Pioneer Corps in the Middle East.

Parliamentary career
Hamilton contested West Fife at the 1945 general election, but lost to Communist Willie Gallacher.

In 1950 he overturned that result, winning by over 13,000 votes. In 1974, after boundary changes, he became MP for Fife Central.

In 1986 Hamilton was replaced as Labour candidate in Fife Central by Henry McLeish, and stood in the ultra-safe Conservative seat of South Hams in Devon, South-West England, where he came third, polling just 8% of the vote and losing to Conservative candidate and sitting MP Anthony Steen.

Anti-royal views
He sponsored the equal pay for equal work bill in the 1970s but is best remembered for his stridently anti-royalist views, which he set out in detail in his book My Queen and I. He branded the Queen "a clockwork doll", Princess Margaret "a floozy", Prince Charles "a twerp", and remarked upon the birth of Princess Anne's son "“How charming, another one on the payroll.”. However, he admired the Queen Mother, declaring on her 80th birthday: "I am glad to salute a remarkable old lady. May she live to be the pride of the family."

Personal life
In 1944, Hamiliton married Joan Callow (died 1968), with whom he had a daughter and a son. He married his second wife Margaret Cogle in 1982 and from his retirement in 1987 until his death the couple lived in Woodhall Spa in Lincolnshire. Willie Hamilton died in Lincoln in 2000, aged 82.

References

External links 
 
BBC report of death of Willie Hamilton

1917 births
2000 deaths
British conscientious objectors
British republicans
Confederation of Health Service Employees-sponsored MPs
Schoolteachers from County Durham
Labour Party (UK) MEPs
Scottish Labour MPs
Members of the Parliament of the United Kingdom for Fife constituencies
MEPs for the United Kingdom 1973–1979
People from Houghton-le-Spring
Politicians from Tyne and Wear
People from Woodhall Spa
Royal Pioneer Corps officers
UK MPs 1950–1951
UK MPs 1951–1955
UK MPs 1955–1959
UK MPs 1959–1964
UK MPs 1964–1966
UK MPs 1966–1970
UK MPs 1970–1974
UK MPs 1974
UK MPs 1974–1979
UK MPs 1979–1983
UK MPs 1983–1987
British Army personnel of World War II